Jimmy McKeown (2 March 1916 – 9 April 1976) was a New Zealand cricketer. He played in five first-class matches for Wellington from 1938 to 1955.

See also
 List of Wellington representative cricketers

References

External links
 

1916 births
1976 deaths
New Zealand cricketers
Wellington cricketers
Cricketers from Wellington City